The National Wool Museum tells the Australian story of wool, fibre and textiles, alongside a range of contemporary exhibitions, public programs and special events. 

The National Wool Museum was established in Geelong, Victoria in 1988 as part of the Australian Bicentennial Celebrations. Housed in the former Dennys, Lascelles Ltd Woolstore at 26 Moorabool Street, Geelong, the Museum began its life as the National Wool Centre and was opened by Her Majesty Queen Elizabeth II on 14 April 1988. 

The Geelong Regional Commission was created in 1977, as part of Victorian government regional planning and gave consideration to a centre of excellence to promote the wool industry. Proposals for the National Wool Centre were put forward as early as 1979. The National Wool Museum was established by the Geelong Regional Commission in 1988 as Australia's only comprehensive museum dedicated to the wool industry at the local, state, national and international level. Initially, the museum consisted of three galleries with the wool buyers' offices and the Geelong Wool Exchange as part of the complex.

Today, the building is now home to the National Wool Museum, Denny's Kitchen (restaurant) and Lambys (nightclub).

References

Buildings and structures in Geelong
Industry museums in Australia
Tourist attractions in Geelong
Museums established in 1988
1988 establishments in Australia
Museums in Victoria (Australia)
Textile museums
Wool organizations